Christopher T. Johnson (born December 3, 1960) is a former American football strong safety who played professionally for the Philadelphia Eagles of the National Football League (NFL).  He played college football for the Millersville Marauders.

References

1960 births
Living people
American football safeties
Millersville Marauders football players
Philadelphia Eagles players
Players of American football from Miami